was a anti-revisionist Marxist-Leninist communist party in Japan. The party was formed in July 1974, through the merger of the Japan Communist Party (Marxist-Leninist) Yamaguchi Prefucture Commission and the Reconstruction Preparation Committee of the Japan Communist Party.

In June 1999, JCP(ML) merged with the Communist League (Red Flag Faction), forming the Workers Communist Party. Another part of its members formed Japanese Communist Party (Action Faction).

Communist parties in Japan
Anti-revisionist organizations
Stalinist parties
Defunct Maoist parties
Far-left politics in Japan
Maoism in Asia